The 1991–92 FC Bayern Munich season was the 92nd season in the club's history and 27th season since promotion from Regionalliga Süd in 1965.  Bayern finished in tenth place in the Bundesliga having sixteen fewer points than champion VfB Stuttgart.  This finish was the lowest since Bayern finished twelfth in 1977–78.  The Bundesliga season consisted of 38 games instead of the usual 34 due to German reunification.  For a second consecutive season, the DFB-Pokal campaign was ended after one match.  The UEFA Cup campaign lasted two rounds when Bayern was eliminated by Boldklubben 1903.  Three managers were in charge of the club this season.  Jupp Heynckes was manager until 8 October), Søren Lerby led the team from 9 October to 11 March, and Erich Ribbeck finished the season.

Results

Friendlies

Fuji-Cup

Bundesliga

League results

League table

DFB Pokal

UEFA Cup

1st round

2nd round

Team statistics

Players

Squad, appearances and goals

|-
|colspan="14"|Players sold or loaned out after the start of the season:

|}

Bookings

Transfers

In

Out

References

Bayern
FC Bayern Munich seasons